The 1977 Hamilton Tiger-Cats season was the 20th season for the team in the Canadian Football League and their 28th overall. The Tiger-Cats finished in 4th place in the Eastern Conference with a 5–11 record and missed the playoffs. Frank M.Gibson would be in his final season as the Secretary-Treasurer of the Tiger-Cats. A trophy, bearing his name, was instituted by the CFL in 1977 recognizing the Outstanding Rookie in the Eastern Division. Coming off a season as Toronto's outstanding defensive player, he was also an Eastern Football Conference All-Star in 1977.

Regular season

Season standings

Season schedule

Awards and honours
CFL's Most Outstanding Player Award – Jimmy Edwards (RB)
Tommy Joe Coffey was Elected into the Canadian Football Hall of Fame as a Player on, June 25, 1977.

References

1977 Canadian Football League season by team
Hamilton Tiger-Cats seasons
Hamilton Tiger-Cats